Jorge Arturo Echavarría Alemán (born January 18, 1988, in Río Bravo, Tamaulipas) is a professional Mexican footballer who currently plays for Loros UdeC.

External links
 

Jorge Eschavarria at Soccerstand
Jorge Eschavarria at Televisa

1988 births
Living people
Footballers from Tamaulipas
Association football defenders
Mexican footballers
Indios de Ciudad Juárez footballers
Altamira F.C. players
Querétaro F.C. footballers
Coras de Nayarit F.C. footballers
Club Atlético Zacatepec players
Potros UAEM footballers
Loros UdeC footballers
People from Río Bravo, Tamaulipas
Liga MX players
Ascenso MX players
Liga Premier de México players